PUB was one of the major department stores in Stockholm, Sweden, located in two buildings at Hötorget, Stockholm city center. PUB was opened in 1882 and rapidly expanded. The name PUB is for the initials of Paul Urbanus Bergström, the founder of the store, who owned a great deal of buildings and business in the area.

In the late 20th century, the upper 4 storeys of the department store were converted into a hotel: the Rica Hotel Kungsgatan, later the Scandic Hotel Kungsgatan. In 2015, plans were announced to close the last remaining portion of the store and convert the entire building to the Scandic Hotel Haymarket.

Other information
In April 1917, when the Russian Bolshevik leader Lenin traveled through Stockholm, the Swedish Communists Ture Nerman and Fredrik Ström took their comrade to PUB where they bought him a new suit so he would look good coming back to Russia.
Greta Garbo started to work as a clerk at PUB, 1920. She left 1922 to study at the Royal Dramatic Theatre in Stockholm.
 In December 2009 PUB became the center of the political hot potato Noko Jeans who sold the first North Korean jeans at the department store but was pulled by PUB after a political controversy regarding the working conditions.

Gallery

References

Buildings and structures in Stockholm
Department stores of Sweden